Poropanchax normani, also known as the Norman's lampeye, is a species of Poeciliidae native to Africa.

Description 
The Norman's lampeye is named for its bright markings located on its eyes. It is lightly colored throughout the rest of its body.

Distribution 
This species is found throughout Central and Western Africa. It can be found in small rivers and swamps.

Diet 
This fish feeds on aquatic invertebrates. In captivity, it thrives on a varied diet, such as Artemia, Daphnia, and bloodworms, and will also take small pellets and crushed flake foods.

References

Poeciliidae
Fish of Africa
Freshwater fish genera
Ray-finned fish genera
Fish described in 1928